"Lonely" is a song by Norwegian DJ Matoma featuring American singer Max, released on 23 March 2018 as the second single from Matoma's second album One in a Million. It was produced by Matoma in collaboration with the UK songwriting collective The Six, and the English DJ Digital Farm Animals. The track reached the top 50 of the US Dance/Electronic Songs chart and the Swedish Heatseeker chart published by Sverigetopplistan.

Composition
Matoma wrote "Lonely" about "fake people that aren't there for you and bring you down with their negative energy".

Music
"Lonely" is an uptempo EDM-pop song with a tropical-influenced drop. It begins with Max's "sultry" vocals along with minimal percussion and gradually builds on its bass and synthesizer instrumentation.

Critical reception
Billboard called the song a "bouncy tropical jam", with edm.com also noting its "upbeat, tropical sounding instrumental drop complete with synths and a catchy melody". Aficia considered it "bright and seductive" and acclaimed Max for his "warm vocal harmonies and flights", as well as the song's "melodic and catchy rhythm" and hook.

Music video
The music video was released in April 2018 and features a group of dancers in a club setting. Max is shown singing the song while looking into a mirror in the club's bathroom.

Track listing

Charts

References

2018 singles
2018 songs
Matoma songs
Max Schneider songs
Songs written by Richard Boardman
Songs written by Pablo Bowman
Songs written by Digital Farm Animals
Songs written by Sarah Blanchard
Songs written by Cleo Tighe
Song recordings produced by Digital Farm Animals